The Office Group (TOG) provides over 50 flexible design-led workspaces in the UK and Germany, with the majority spread across London. With a focus on developing landmark properties, the design of each workspace responds to the history and location of the building. TOG workspaces offer a mix of private offices that house from 1 person up to 2,000 with coworking memberships, relaxed lounge spaces, meeting rooms and event space hire, allowing different scales of business - from start-ups and SMEs to multinationals - to coexist under one roof. All TOG members have access to the entire network of buildings as part of their TOG membership. A commitment to wellbeing at work means that many TOG workspaces include gyms for member use, while in-house cafes offer a changing menu of freshly cooked nutritionally-focused food.

Workspace locations
The Office Group currently has 51 buildings located in London, Bristol and Leeds, including iconic addresses at One Canada Square, The Shard and the Gridiron Building in Kings Cross, with several buildings in development, including Chancery House  and five in Germany – TOG’s first expansion outside of the UK. Sustainable design is a core principle of TOG developments, with buildings integrating high level energy efficiency programmes, renewable energy, rainwater harvesting, a focus on natural light and green spaces.

TOG workspaces and services

TOG offers a variety of workspaces: including private offices, closed door coworking areas, lounge space and meeting rooms.  Many of TOG’s buildings include extra on-site facilities such as nutritionally-focused cafes and Caravan barista counters, fitness studios with Peloton bikes and Manor gyms, 12 event spaces with bars, 2 penthouse apartments, quiet libraries, meditation rooms, plus plenty of outside spaces including terraces, balconies, and rooftop gardens with panoramic city views. Alongside workspace, TOG also offers a virtual office service enabling members use of their home building address for their business, professional call answering and forwarding and mail handling; TOG Studios with production packages to create podcasts and filmed commercials.

Germany expansion
In 2019, TOG acquired its first buildings outside of the UK with an expansion into Germany. There are five buildings in total, with three in Berlin, one in Hamburg and one in Frankfurt. Three buildings are due to open in 2020 with 2 more the following year.

Management and ownership
TOG was founded in 2004 by co-CEOs Olly Olsen and Charlie Green, launching with a building on City Road. In September 2010, when TOG had seven buildings in its portfolio, Travelex founder Lloyd Dorfman funded the management buyout of the previous private equity shareholders to become the majority shareholder and Chairman of TOG. In June 2017, investment firm Blackstone acquired a majority stake in TOG. Charlie and Olly remain shareholders in the business.

Network Rail 
In 2014, Network Rail and TOG announced they would open three drop-in workspaces in London King’s Cross railway station, Liverpool Street station and Leeds railway station as part of a joint venture called The Station Office Network, an initiative to provide mobile offices in railway stations throughout the UK’s major cities. TOG now has locations in six mainline railway stations; Marylebone, Paddington, Liverpool Street, Victoria, Waterloo and Leeds.

References

Real estate companies established in 2004
British companies established in 2004
Property services companies of the United Kingdom
2017 mergers and acquisitions
The Blackstone Group companies
Coworking space providers